Zorri is both a given name and a surname. Notable people with the name include:

Tatiana Zorri (born 1977), Italian footballer
Zorri Bliss, a character in the 2019 film Star Wars: The Rise of Skywalker

See also
Sorri

Italian-language surnames